Mohamed Yekhlef (born January 12, 1981, in Tlemcen) is a retired Algerian footballer. He last played as a defender for USM Alger in the Algerian Ligue Professionnelle 1.

Clubs
Yekhlef played for:
2000 - 2005 WA Tlemcen
2005 - 2011 ES Sétif
2011 - 2013 USM Alger

Honours
 Won the Algerian Cup once with WA Tlemcen in 2002
 Won the Algerian League twice with ES Sétif in 2007 and 2009
 Won the Arab Champions League twice with ES Sétif in 2007 and 2008
 Won the North African Cup of Champions once with ES Sétif in 2009
 Finalist of the CAF Confederation Cup once with ES Sétif in 2009
 Won the North African Super Cup once with ES Sétif in 2010
 Won the North African Cup Winners Cup once with ES Sétif in 2010

References

1981 births
Algerian footballers
Living people
ES Sétif players
USM Alger players
WA Tlemcen players
Algeria A' international footballers
People from Tlemcen
2011 African Nations Championship players
Algerian Ligue Professionnelle 1 players
Association football defenders
21st-century Algerian people